Ram Shri Mugali (Ranganatha Srinivasa Mugali) (15 July 1906 – 20 February 1993) was a Kannada language writer. He was awarded the central Sahitya Akademi in 1956 for his work "Kannada Sahitya Charitre". He was the president of the 44th Kannada Sahitya Sammelana held in Siddganga, in the Tumkur district of Karnataka state, India.

Early life 
Mugali was born in a Deshastha Madhva Brahmin family in Hole Alur in the Ron Taluk of Gadag district, British India. In 1933, he was appointed professor of Kannada at Willingdon College, Sangli. Among his students at Willingdon were writers Subbanna Ekkundi and Gangadhar V. Chittal. In 1966, Mugali retired as a principal of the Willingdon College. From 1967 to 1970, he worked as the Head of the Kannada Department at the Bangalore University, Bangalore. Mugali died in Bangalore on 20 February 1992.

Works
 Kannada Sahitya Charitre
 Kannada Sahitya Charitre - Aadhunika Kannada Sahitya Charitre Sahita
 Kannada Sahitya Vimarsheya Thatvika Vivechane
 Bendre Kavya
 Sahityopasane
 Sri Sri Aravinda Makaranda
 Punarnavodaya Mattu Sahityopasane
 Pracheen Kannada Sahitya Roopagalu
 Kannada Kavya Sanchaya
 Sri Aravindara Savitri
 Agnivarna
 Nava Manava
 Basiga
 Apr Karune
 Om Shanthi
 Kaarana Purasha Mattu Baaluri
 Anna
 Dhanajaya
 Ettida Kai
 Rannana Kriti Ratna
 Kannadada Kare
 Matembudu Jyotirlinga

References

 Mugali in kannada literature
 Mugali's books
 Mugali's books at Bangalore University
 Sahitya Akademi Award to Kannada Writers

Academic staff of Bangalore University
1906 births
1992 deaths
Kannada-language writers
People from Gadag district
Recipients of the Sahitya Akademi Award in Kannada
Writers from Karnataka
20th-century Indian linguists
Indian male writers